Hopkins Mountain Historic District is a national historic district located in the Monongahela National Forest near Alvon, Greenbrier County, West Virginia. The district encompasses two contributing buildings, one contributing site, and two contributing structures. It includes the Mountain Tower Road (Forest Service Road 139), fire tower and the fireman'sresidence. They were all constructed by the members of Camp Alvon of the Civilian Conservation Corps (CCC) in 1935. Located nearby is a contemporary privy with board-and-batten siding and a gable roof, also built by the CCC. The property also includes the Civil War Trail. It was used by the Virginia 26th Battalion under the command of Lt. Colonel George M. Edgar for its retreat from the Battle of Droop Mountain on November 6 and 7, 1863. Also on the property is a logging tramway in use from about 1908 to the 1920s.

It was listed on the National Register of Historic Places in 1994.

References

American Civil War sites in West Virginia
American Craftsman architecture in West Virginia
Houses in Greenbrier County, West Virginia
Bungalow architecture in West Virginia
Civilian Conservation Corps in West Virginia
Greenbrier County, West Virginia in the American Civil War
Historic districts in Greenbrier County, West Virginia
Houses completed in 1935
Houses on the National Register of Historic Places in West Virginia
National Register of Historic Places in Greenbrier County, West Virginia
Historic districts on the National Register of Historic Places in West Virginia